Austrogomphus divaricatus, also known as Austrogomphus (Pleiogomphus) divaricatus, is a species of dragonfly of the family Gomphidae, 
commonly known as the fork hunter. 
It inhabits streams and rivers in northern Queensland, Australia.

Austrogomphus divaricatus is a medium-sized, black and yellow dragonfly.

Gallery

See also
 List of Odonata species of Australia

References

Gomphidae
Odonata of Australia
Insects of Australia
Endemic fauna of Australia
Taxa named by J.A.L. (Tony) Watson
Insects described in 1991